The Dalle Molle Institute for Semantic and Cognitive Studies ( or ISSCO) is a research institute in Geneva, Switzerland. It was founded in Lugano in 1972 by Angelo Dalle Molle through the Fondation Dalle Molle, to conduct research into the application of artificial intelligence to linguistics, cognitive science and semantics with the aim of developing systems for automated translation.

ISSCO is one of four Swiss research organisations founded by the Dalle Molle foundation, of which three are in the field of artificial intelligence.

References 

Cognitive science research institutes
Research institutes in Switzerland
University of Geneva
Schools in Geneva
Schools in the canton of Ticino
Educational institutions established in 1972
Research institutes established in 1972
1972 establishments in Switzerland